Sulzbach is the most populous residential district (of five) of the city of Billigheim, Germany.
It is located in Neckar-Odenwald-county, five kilometers west of Billigheim and 6 km east of Mosbach.

Sulzbach has about 1803 inhabitants, who are largely Christian.  A large number of the inhabitants are Roman Catholic, but there is also a significant Evangelical community in the city.

Neckar-Odenwald-Kreis